Streptoglossa macrocephala is a species of flowering plant in the family Asteraceae. It is a  spreading or upright perennial herb with pink to purple flowers. It grows in Queensland, Western Australia and the Northern Territory.

Description
The leaves and branches are strongly fragrant, and covered with soft, weak, separated thin hairs to almost smooth, thickly glandular and occasionally shiny. The  pink to purple "flowers" are sometimes covered by upper leaves, florets in a group of 60-100.

Taxonomy and naming
Streptoglossa macrocephala was first described by Ferdinand von Mueller as Pluchea macrocephala. In 1981 Clyde Robert Dunlop changed the name to Streptoglossa macrocephala and the description was published in  Journal of the Adelaide Botanic Garden. The specific epithet (macrocephala) means "large headed".

Distribution and habitat
This streptoglossa grows in red sand, limestone, and dunes of the Tanami Desert in the Northern Territory, the Gibson Desert and Great Sandy Desert of Western Australia. Also scattered locations on rocky or sandy soils from the Kimberley to Shark Bay in Western Australia and from Tennant Creek in the Northern Territory to western Queensland.

References

`

Asterales of Australia
Flora of the Northern Territory
Flora of Western Australia
Flora of Queensland
macrocephala